Caraș County is one of the historic counties of Romania in the historic region of the Banat. The county seat was Oravița. The county was founded in 1926, following the division of the former Caraș-Severin County.

In 1938, the county was disestablished and incorporated into the newly formed Ținutul Timiș, but it was re-established in 1940 after the fall of Carol II's regimeonly to be abolished 10 years later by the Communist regime on September 6, 1950.

Geography
Caraș County covered 4,693 km2 and was located in the Banat region in the southwestern part of Greater Romania. Currently, the territory that comprised Caraș County is mostly now included in the reconstituted Caraș-Severin County. In the interwar period, the county neighbored Timiș-Torontal County to the north and northwest, Severin County to the east and northeast, and the Kingdom of Yugoslavia to the west, south, and southwest.

Administrative organization
Administratively, Caraș County was originally divided into five districts (plăși): 
Plasa Bocșa-Montană
Plasa Bozovici 
Plasa Moldova-Nouă
Plasa Oravița
Plasa Reșița

Subsequently, a sixth district was established:Plasa Sasca-Montană

The county contained two urban communes (cities): Oravița (the county's headquarters) and Reșița (the largest city of the county).

Population 
According to the 1930 census data, the county's population was 200,929, ethnically divided as follows: 69.5% Romanians, 12.8% Germans, 4.9% Serbs and Croats, 3.6% Czechs and Slovaks, 2.8% Romanies, 2.5% Hungarians, as well as other minorities. The county's population was divided religiously as follows: 70.3% Eastern Orthodox, 21.5% Roman Catholic, 5.1% Greek Catholic, 1.5% Baptist, as well as other minorities.

Urban population
In the year 1930, the county's urban population was 29,453, ethnically divided as follows: 43.4% Germans, 42.2% Romanians, 8.8% Hungarians, 1.6% Czechs and Slovaks, 1.4% Jews, as well as other minorities. From the religious point of view, the urban population consisted of 50.5% Roman Catholic, 39.7% Eastern Orthodox, 3.7% Greek Catholic, 2.1% Reformed, 1.7% Jewish, 1.6% Lutheran, as well as other minorities.

References

External links

  Caraș County on memoria.ro

Former counties of Romania
1925 establishments in Romania
1938 disestablishments in Romania
1940 establishments in Romania
1950 disestablishments in Romania
States and territories established in 1925
States and territories disestablished in 1938
States and territories established in 1940
States and territories disestablished in 1950